WTHC-LD (virtual channel 42 and VHF digital channel 3) is a low-powered independent television station licensed to Atlanta, Georgia, United States. From 1994 to 2007, it was owned and operated by The Atlanta Channel, Inc., which also broadcast the channel into many local hotels.  Programming consists almost entirely of recorded information for tourists staying in downtown hotels, although the signal can usually be picked up as far away as Sandy Springs, about ten miles or 15 km away. The station is itself atop Atlanta's most well-known hotel, the Westin Peachtree Plaza, on a mast constructed for WVEU (channel 69, now WUPA), along with other stations.

Due to multipath interference as an analog television station, it is now a digital-only station, which also allows a much greater broadcast range on its 7-kilowatt signal (although ATSC is also extremely prone to multipath).  It received a digital flash-cut permit in March 2006 and quickly made the switch by very early April, making it one of the first low-powered digital television stations in the country.  The station's only active channel (virtual 42.1) uses an SDTV screen resolution of 480i.

History
Originally applied for in early 1981, it was assigned W63BB on channel 63 in mid-1987.  After several modifications and extensions to its unbuilt construction permit, it moved and became W42BQ on analog channel 42 in late 1992, making way for the new WHSG-TV on 63.  After finally going on the air in 1993, it became The Atlanta Channel in 1994, and the broadcast callsign WTHC-LP was assigned by request in early 2000.  It was automatically changed by the FCC in July 2009 to WTHC-LD, even though it had already been digital for three years.

In 2007, The Atlanta Channel, Inc. and the station were sold to Beach TV Properties, Inc., owners of a similarly formatted station in Panama City, Florida, among others.

Digital television

Digital channel

See also
 WHDT
 WHDT-LD

References

External links
WMV streaming of The Atlanta Channel

Low-power television stations in the United States
THC-LD